Torpedo is a 2012 French-Belgian comedy film directed by Matthieu Donck.

Plot

Michel Ressac wins a dinner with cyclist legend Eddy Merckx in an advertising campaign to promote the sales of sofas and hopes that he can do his own father, who is a huge cycling fan, a favour. But unfortunately he arrives too late at the dinner. Ressac then tries to reclaim his prize and win his family's sympathy back...

Cast
 François Damiens as Michel Ressac
 Audrey Dana as Christine
 Cédric Constantin as Kevin
 Christian Charmetant as Pascal Dumont
 Gustave de Kervern as Garage owner
 Eddy Merckx as himself
 Jasmina Douieb as Saleswoman

References

External links
 https://www.imdb.com/title/tt1891968/reference

2012 films
Belgian comedy road movies
French comedy road movies
2010s comedy road movies
Films set in Belgium
Films shot in Belgium
Eddy Merckx
Cultural depictions of Eddy Merckx
2010s French films